The 2004 San Jose Earthquakes season was the ninth season of the team's existence. It was the first under the guidance of Dominic Kinnear has head coach, after Frank Yallop was announced to be coaching the Canadian national team in December 2003. San Jose Earthquakes selected Ryan Cochrane with the 5th pick in the Major League Soccer Super Draft after acquiring the pick in the Joe Cannon (soccer) Trade. They also selected Steve Cronin, Mike Wilson, Marin Pusek, and Tighe Dombrowski. Midway through the season, they traded for Wes Hart from the Colorado Rapids and Chris Brown from the New England Revolution to help solidify their playoff run. Troy Dayak and Eddie Robinson missed most of the season due to injuries. They called in Tim Weaver from the San Francisco Bay Seals and Leighton o'Brien for a number of games to fill out their bench. They didn't appear in any games. San Jose finished the last 7 weeks of the season without a win, coming down to the last game of the season against the Dallas Burn needing a tie or a win to advance into the playoffs. They pulled out a 2-2 tie qualifying for the playoffs.

Squad

Current squad 
As of August 18, 2009.

Club

Management

Other information

Competitions

Major League Soccer

Matches

MLS Cup Playoffs

U.S. Open Cup

CONCACAF Champions Cup

Source:

Standings 

The top four teams in each conference make the playoffs.
x = playoff berth

References

External links
San Jose Earthquakes season stats | sjearthquakes.com
San Jose Earthquakes Game Results | Soccerstats.us
San Jose Earthquakes 100 Greatest Goals 2004 | YouTube

2004
San Jose Earthquakes
San Jose Earthquakes
San Jose Earthquakes